Pedro Gonzalez or Pedro González may refer to:

People

Arts and Entertainment
Pedro Gonzalez Gonzalez (1925–2006), U.S. character actor
Pedro González (humorist) (born 1965), Colombian humorist, journalist and actor
Pedro J. González (1895–1995) Mexican singer-songwriter, activist, and radio host

Politics
Pedro González de Lara (fl 1095–1130), Spanish noble and statesman
Pedro González de Mendoza (1428–1495), Spanish cardinal and statesman
Pedro González Llamas (fl. 1808–1812), Spanish general in the Peninsular War
Pedro Miguel González Pinzón (born 1965), Panamanian politician, speaker of the National Assembly

Religion
Pedro Gallego (c.1197–1267), Spanish scholar and bishop
Blessed Peter González (1190–1246), Spanish Roman Catholic priest of the mediaeval period

Sports

Association football
Pedro González (Peruvian footballer) (born 1943), Peruvian football midfielder
Pedro González (footballer, born 1967), Chilean football forward
Pedro González (footballer, born 1968), Spanish football left-back
Pedro González (footballer, born 1970), Argentine football winger

Other sports
Pedro González (baseball) (1937–2021), Dominican baseball player
Pedro González (cyclist) (born 1983), Argentine cyclist

Places
Pedro González, Panama

Other
Petrus Gonsalvus (fl. 1537–1617), first recorded case of hypertrichosis